"You're Gettin' a Little Too Smart" is a song written by Abrim Tilmon and performed by the Detroit Emeralds.  It reached number 10 on the R&B chart and just missed the Billboard Hot 100 in 1973, reaching number 101.  The song was featured on their 1973 album, I'm in Love with You.

The song was produced by Katouzzion and arranged by Abrim Tilmon and Johnny Allen.

References

1973 songs
1973 singles
The Detroit Emeralds songs